The given name Kane is shared by:

In arts and media
Kane Alexander, Australian jazz and classical singer
Kane Brown (born 1993), American country music singer
Kane Churko (born 1986), Canadian record producer
Kane Hodder (born 1955), American actor and stuntman
Kane Parsons (a.k.a. Kane Pixels, born 2005), American filmmaker and VFX artist, known for his The Backrooms YouTube videos
Kane West (a.k.a. Gus Lobban), Kero Kero Bonito member and solo electronic music producer

In sports

Rugby
Kane Barrett (born 1990), New Zealand rugby union footballer
Kane Bentley (born 1987), New Zealand rugby league footballer
Kane Cleal (born 1987), Australian rugby league footballer
Kane Evans (born 1992), Australian rugby league footballer

Other sports
Kane Ashcroft (1986–2015), English footballer who played for York City
Kane Avellano (born 1993), British adventurer and long distance motorcycle rider
Kane Brigg (born 1988), Australian high jumper and triple jumper
Kane Cornes (born 1983), Australian rules footballer
Kane Ferdinand (born 1992), Irish footballer
Kane Waselenchuk (born 1981), Canadian racquetball player
Kane Williamson (born 1990), New Zealand cricketer

Elsewhere
 Kane Tanaka (1903–2022), Japanese supercentenarian

See also
Kane (disambiguation)#People

English masculine given names